Juan Carlos Sanhueza Gómez (born 17 May 1989) was a Chilean footballer.

He played for Ñublense.

References
 
 

1989 births
Living people
Chilean footballers
Ñublense footballers
Unión Santa María footballers
Deportes Colchagua footballers
Chilean Primera División players
Primera B de Chile players
Association football midfielders
People from Chillán